Kushang Sherpa (born 15 Feb 1965) is an Indian mountaineer, who in 1998 became the first person to reach the summit of Mount Everest from three sides. In recognition of his achievements, Government of India in 2003 awarded him with Tenzing Norgay National Adventure Award.

Early life
Kushang Sherpa was born on 15 February 1965 in a village in the Himalayas named Walung near Makalu base, Nepal. He ran away from home the first time at the age of 14 to work as a porter on an expedition that was passing through his village. He is the first person to have summited Mount Everest from three points of the compass.

Kushang Dorjee Sherpa is from Makalu originally, presently he lives in Darjeeling, West Bengal of India.

Ascents
Sherpa is the first person who has summited Mount Everest from three points of the compass.
Kushang Dorjee Sherpa first summited Everest on 10 May 1993 via the standard south east ridge route. Next, he summited via the standard north east ridge route on 17 May 1996. On 28 May 1998, he summited a third time the standard south east ridge.
His fourth summit was via the east face (Khangsung face) of Everest on 28 May 1999. Kushang Sherpa lives in Darjeeling today.

See also
 List of Mount Everest records of India
 List of Mount Everest records
 List of Mount Everest summiters by number of times to the summit

References

External links
Image of Kushang Sherpa during Everest Summit via East Face}

1965 births
Living people
Indian mountain climbers
Recipients of the Tenzing Norgay National Adventure Award
Indian summiters of Mount Everest
Nepalese mountain climbers